Ceroxys cinifera is a species of picture-winged fly in the genus Ceroxys of the family Ulidiidae.

Distribution
C. cinifera has been recorded in Ukraine and Southern Russia.

References

cinifera
Insects described in 1846
Diptera of Europe
Taxa named by Hermann Loew